Naukšēni Municipality is a former municipality in Vidzeme, Latvia. The municipality was formed in 2009 by merging Naukšēni Parish and Ķoņi Parish the administrative centre being Naukšēni. As of 2020, the population was 1,675.

On 1 July 2021, Naukšēni Municipality ceased to exist and its territory was merged into Valmiera Municipality.

Twin towns — sister cities

Naukšēni is twinned with:
 Borgholzhausen, Germany
 Helme, Estonia

See also
Administrative divisions of Latvia

References

 
Former municipalities of Latvia